Jarosław Paśnik (born 19 February 1983 in Garwolin, Poland) is a Polish footballer who plays as a goalkeeper for Polish second-tier side Znicz Pruszków.

External links
 

1983 births
Living people
Polish footballers
People from Garwolin County
Sportspeople from Masovian Voivodeship
Association football goalkeepers
MG MZKS Kozienice players
Polonia Warsaw players
Ruch Chorzów players
Znicz Pruszków players